Bradley Langenhoven (born 3 December 1983 in Walvis Bay) is a rugby union player who plays for Namibia. He plays as a wing or center.

Langenhoven made his international debut against South Africa on 15 August 2007, in which he scored a try. Langenhoven was in the Namibian squad for the 2007 World Cup finals. He played in all four matches, scoring a try in the 10–87 loss against the hosts France. He is playing currently for SC 1880 Frankfurt, current German champion.

References

1983 births
Living people
Expatriate rugby union players in Germany
Namibia international rugby union players
Namibian expatriate rugby union players
Namibian expatriate sportspeople in Germany
Namibian people of German descent
Namibian rugby union players
Rugby union centres
Rugby union players from Walvis Bay
Rugby union wings
SC 1880 Frankfurt players